Daniel Mminele (born 1965) was the chief executive officer (CEO) of Absa Group Limited, a financial services conglomerate, with headquarters in Johannesburg, South Africa, and subsidiaries in Botswana, Ghana, Kenya, Mauritius, Mozambique, Seychelles, South Africa, Tanzania, Uganda and Zambia.

Prior to joining Absa Group as CEO in January 2020, Mminele spent more than 20 years at the South African Reserve Bank (SARB), where he rose through the ranks to be a Deputy Governor and a member of key committees such as the Monetary Policy Committee and Financial Stability Committee. He retired from the SARB in June 2019, after his second consecutive five-year term as Deputy Governor came to an end.

Background and education
Mminele was born in Phalaborwa, Mopani District Municipality, Limpopo Province, South Africa, in 1965. He went to school in Germany, and was trained as a banker at Sparkasse Paderborn, in association with the Chamber of Commerce and Industry of East-Westphalia (Bielefeld), obtaining his banking qualification in 1987. He also later obtained various associate certificates from the Chartered Institute of Bankers of the United Kingdom, attending classes for these at City of London Polytechnic (later Guildhall University).

Career
Mminele spent eight years (1987 to 1995) in various roles at the Westdeutsche Landesbank Girozentrale, at its offices in Düsseldorf and London. He returned to South Africa in 1995, then spent about two years at Commerzbank, working as a customer relations manager in corporate banking, and about equal time at African Merchant Bank, as a project and structured finance specialist, based in Johannesburg. In 1999, he joined the South African Reserve Bank. In 2009, he was appointed as deputy governor responsible for financial markets and international economic relations.

Mminele served as chief executive officer of Absa Group from 15 January 2020 until 20 April 2021 being the first person of African descent to serve in at role.

Honors and awards
While at the SARB, he was a member of the Reserve Bank's monetary policy and financial stability committee. With his appointment as CEO at Absa, Mminele is the first Black African to serve in that role. In 2018, the German President Frank-Walter Steinmeier bestowed the Great Order of Merit to Mminele for his work in promoting German-South African relations. The Great Order of Merit is the highest honour Germany can pay to an individual for services to the country.
In 2019 he was awarded the Lifetime Achiever Award by the Association of Black Securities and Investment Professionals (ABSIP)

Personal life

See also
 Wendy Lucas-Bull
 Maria Ramos

References

External links
 Barclays Africa to revert name back to Absa

1965 births
Living people
Absa people
South African bankers
South African businesspeople
Alumni of the University of London